GTV (Ghana Today Television or Ghana Today) is the national public broadcaster of Ghana, run by the Ghana Broadcasting Corporation.  It commenced operations on July 31, 1965 and was originally known as GBC TV.

GTV broadcasts mainly local programming, with over 80% of the schedule consisting of original productions. Although its main production studio is located in Accra, capital city of Ghana, it has affiliations nationwide and covers 98% of the airwaves in Ghana, making it the most powerful mode of advertisement in Ghana. Although GTV is largely funded by the Ghanaian government, it also collects annual fees from viewers.

GTV currently broadcasts shows from international networks from regions such as Europe, US, UK, and Asia. Some of these shows and networks include: In The House, The Cosby Show, Taina, Becker, Everybody Loves Raymond, The Oprah Winfrey Show, Family Matters, Moesha, Soul Food, King of Queens, CNN, PBS, Cartoon Network, NBA, Fresh Prince of Bel Air, Passions, Touched by an Angel, BBC Radio, as well as a host of others. Though most of these shows are no longer broadcast on GTV, they once did or still are.

GTV also shows many foreign movies, particularly American movies, as well as African-American music videos. Although entertaining, most of the shows on GTV are either educational (for example, portraits of Ghanaian artists like Eric Adjetey Anang), or attempt to address Ghanaian social issues. The station also broadcasts live international events like the Olympic Games, FIFA World Cup, Miss World and Miss Universe. Local competitors of GTV TV-Network include TV3 and Metro TV, and all TV broadcast in Ghana located Accra.

References

External links

Broadcasting in Ghana
Publicly funded broadcasters
Television stations in Ghana
Television channels and stations established in 1965
1965 establishments in Ghana
State media